Thomas Wing (1810–1888) was a notable New Zealand master mariner, cartographer, harbourmaster and pilot. He was born in Bradfield, Essex, England in 1810.

References

1810 births
1888 deaths
New Zealand sailors
New Zealand cartographers
English emigrants to New Zealand
People from Tendring (district)